SM U-102 or SM Unterseeboot 102 was a German Type U 57 submarine used by the Imperial German Navy in World War I. U-102 was launched on 12 May 1917. She was commissioned to the Imperial Navy on 18 June 1917.

Service history

About 28 to 30 September 1918 U-102 struck a mine in the North Sea Mine Barrage, east of the Orkney Islands while on her way to home. All of her 42 crew members' lives were claimed by the U-boat's sinking. The wreck of U-102 was located by a sonar sweep in 2006. Information to confirm the identification was obtained by divers in 2007.

Summary of raiding history

See also
 U-boat Campaign (World War I)

References

Notes

Citations

Bibliography

World War I submarines of Germany
Type U 57 submarines
Ships built in Bremen (state)
1917 ships
U-boats commissioned in 1917
U-boats sunk in 1918
U-boats sunk by mines
Ships lost with all hands
Maritime incidents in 1918